Rory Rowland is an American politician. He was a member of the Missouri House of Representatives from the 29th district from 2016 to 2022. He is a member of the Democratic Party. Rowland was elected as mayor of Independence, Missouri in  April 2022.

Electoral history

State Representative

References

Democratic Party members of the Missouri House of Representatives
21st-century American politicians
Living people
Year of birth missing (living people)
Politicians from Independence, Missouri